The National Association of Universities and Higher Education Institutions (Spanish: Asociación Nacional de Universidades e Instituciones de Educación Superior, ANUIES) is a non-governmental organization which includes 191 public and private higher education institutions in Mexico. The association is involved in the development of programs, plans and national policies for higher education, as well as establishing agencies aimed at fostering the development of higher education in the country.

Members

See also 
 Jorge Matute Remus – founder member

References

External links 
 

1950 establishments in Mexico
Organizations established in 1950
Universities and colleges in Mexico
College and university associations and consortia in North America